The 2004 New Zealand Grand Prix was an open wheel racing car race held at Teretonga Park, near Invercargill on 18 January 2004. It was the 49th New Zealand Grand Prix and was open to Formula Ford cars. 

The event was won by Ken Smith who, at the age of 63 became the oldest winner of a Grand Prix in the world. He was followed closely by Andy Knight, crossing the line by one seven-thousandths of a second - the closest finish in New Zealand Grand Prix history. Tim Edgell rounded out the podium, having secured pole position earlier that weekend.

Classification

Qualifying (Top 10 Shootout)

Race

References

External links
 New Zealand Formula Ford

New Zealand Grand Prix
Grand Prix